Hahn Brewery is a brewery that was established by Dr Charles Hahn in 1988 at an old factory site in the suburb of Camperdown in Sydney, New South Wales, Australia.

It was originally a brewer of premium beers, including Hahn Premium and Hahn Premium Light. The 1991 recession resulted in reduced demand, and forced a rethink of this policy. A more mainstream beer called Sydney Bitter was produced, with reasonable success. It has launched two new beers since then: Hahn Super Dry in 2006 and Hahn Super Dry 3.5 in 2009.

In 1993 the brewery was purchased by Australia's second largest brewer Lion Hahn was appointed as the Chief Brewer of Lion Co which, at the time, operated eight breweries in Australia and New Zealand and two in China. Production of Hahn beers was moved to the Tooheys brewery in Auburn. The Camperdown brewery itself was renamed to the Malt Shovel Brewery in honour of the 1st fleet convict turned Australia's first brewer, James Squire. To this day, Hahn still plays a key role in brewing the craft beers at the Malt Shovel Brewery.

Products

See also

Australian pub
Beer in Australia
List of breweries in Australia

References

Bibliography

External links 
 
 Hahn Interview - Interview with Dr Hahn

Kirin Group
Australian beer brands
1986 establishments in Australia
Companies established in 1986
Beer brewing companies based in New South Wales
Food and drink companies based in Sydney
Manufacturing companies based in Sydney
Culture of New South Wales